The Truth About the Harry Quebert Affair is an American mystery drama television miniseries, based on the 2014 novel of the same name by Joël Dicker, that premiered on Epix. The series was directed by Jean-Jacques Annaud and stars Patrick Dempsey, Kristine Froseth, Ben Schnetzer, Damon Wayans Jr., and Virginia Madsen. Prior to its debut in the United States, the series was sold and premiered in international markets.

Premise
The Truth About the Harry Quebert Affair follows "a young writer who heads to Harry Quebert’s home for some inspiration. Instead, he finds that Harry’s been accused of murdering 15-year-old Nola Kellergan, who went missing years prior."

Cast and characters

Episodes

Production

Development
On August 15, 2017, it was announced that Epix had given the production a series order consisting of ten episodes. The series will be entirely directed by Jean-Jacques Annaud. The pilot episode was written by Lyn Greene and Richard Levine who also wrote additional episodes as well. Executive producers include Annaud, Greene, Levine, Tarak Ben Ammar, and Fabio Conversi. Production companies involved with the series include MGM Television, Eagle Pictures, and Barbary Films.

Casting
Alongside the initial series order announcement, it was confirmed that Patrick Dempsey, Ben Schnetzer, Damon Wayans Jr., Virginia Madsen, Kristine Froseth, Colm Feore, Josh Close, Matt Frewer, Craig Eldridge, Connor Price, Victoria Clark, Tessa Mossey, Kurt Fuller, Don Harvey, Felicia Shulman, and Wayne Knight had been cast in the series.

Filming
Principal photography for the series began in the fall of 2017 in Montreal, Quebec, Canada.

Release

Premiere
On April 6, 2018, a "sneak peek" 35 minute presentation of select scenes from the series were debuted at international television festival Canneseries in Cannes, France. Those cast and crew members in attendance included Jean-Jacques Annaud, Patrick Dempsey, Ben Schnetzer, and Kristine Froseth.

Distribution
In the United Kingdom, the series premiered on Sky Witness on September 4, 2018. In Australia, the series premiered on Stan on September 28, 2018. In Denmark, the series premiered on C More on November 1, 2018. In Switzerland, the series premiered on the French speaking channel RTS Un on November 20, 2018. In France, the series premiered on TF1 on November 21, 2018. In New Zealand, the series was released on Lightbox on December 18, 2018.
In Italy the series premiered on Sky Atlantic on March 20, 2019.  In Canada the series premiered on CTV Drama Channel on September 15, 2019.

References

External links

2010s American drama television miniseries
English-language television shows
MGM+ original programming
Upcoming drama television series
Television shows based on Swiss novels
Television series by MGM Television